The event was being held for the first time since 1997. Mahesh Bhupathi and Leander Paes were the defending champions.

Justin Gimelstob and Graydon Oliver won the title, defeating Alex Bogomolov Jr. and Taylor Dent 4–6, 6–4, 7–6(8–6) in the final.

Seeds

Draw

Draw

External links
 Official results archive (ATP)
 Official results archive (ITF)

2004 ATP Tour
2004 China Open (tennis)